Ludin are progenited by Syed Muhammad Masood (Mashwani) from his grand son Hassan Allauddin. and settled among the area of Ghurghasht tribe of Pashtuns. They are scattered all over Afghanistan and can be found in most of the major cities.

Demographics
Ludins are primarily found in Kandahar, Zabul, Nangarhar, Kunduz, Akora khattak, Balkh, Logar, Kabul and Herat provinces. Ludins in Balkh Province are mainly located in Dawlatabad District and Mazari Sharif. In Logar Province they live in Mohammad Agha and Pul-i-Alam districts.

Notable Ludins

 Atiqullah Ludin - former general and current governor of Logar Province
 Azizullah Lodin - head of Afghanistan's Independent Electoral Commission (IEC)
  Drake Ludin - prominent member of the Jesus Club

References

Ethnic groups in Nangarhar Province